Daphna Joel (Hebrew: דפנה יואל; born January 20, 1967) is an Israeli neuroscientist and advocate for neurofeminism. She is best known for her research which claims that there is no such thing as a "male brain" or a "female brain". Joel's research has been criticized by other neuroscientists who argue that male and female brains, on average, show distinct differences and can be classified with a high level of accuracy. Joel is a member of The NeuroGenderings Network, an international group of researchers in gender studies and neuroscience. They are critical of what they call 'neurosexism' in the scientific community. Joel has given lectures on her work in both scientific and lay conventions around the world.

Since 2003, Joel has served as the head of the psychobiology department at Tel Aviv University, and in 2013 was appointed chair of the PhD committee of the School of Psychological Sciences.

Academic career 

Joel began her academic career during her compulsory military service, in the Talpiot program, which she left after a year and a half. After completing her military service, Joel enrolled in the Tel Aviv University program for outstanding students. She completed a bachelor's degree in medical science, followed by a doctorate in psychobiology (1998), which focused on how connections in the brain are organized. She then joined the faculty of neuroscience, after receiving an Alon fellowship for young Israeli scientists. Her main area of research for 15 years was the cerebral mechanisms of obsessive-compulsive disorder (OCD).

One of the main questions in Joel's research is whether there is a "male brain" and a "female brain"; whether human brains can be divided in a binary way, as is generally done with human genitals. According to Joelj's research, the answer is "no".

One of the most important studies on which Joel's theory is based was done by pharmacologist Margaret McCarthy from the University of Maryland. McCarthy found that characteristics in male and female animal brains can cause changes in their shapes as a result of external circumstances such as stress. Joel concluded from the results of this study and other studies she examined that if under pressure certain areas of the brain can turn from their typical "female form" to the typical "male form" – there is no point in talking about a female brain and a male brain, and that this division is meaningless.

According to Joel, the brain has no sex, and the differences between "female" and "male" brains, though they exist, are minor and unrelated to each other. She was the first to talk about correlation in the context of the brain: a particular area of the brain, such as a large amygdala, does not predict anything about a different part of the brain, say, a small hippocampus. Although there are differences in the brain between males and females, they are not organized. Thus, if a "male" characteristic is found in a particular area, it does not actually mean anything about the masculinity or femininity of the other brain characteristics, which are determined by the complex interactions between sex, genetics and the environment.

Joel's conclusions have been challenged by others in the field of neuroscience, and she met with obstacles getting her first study on the subject published in 2011: Male or Female? Brains are Intersex.

Joel is a member of The NeuroGenderings Network and has advocated in the media for a less gender essentialist approach to neuroscience.

Gender and feminism 
Joel counts gender and feminism among her research interests. In an interview with The Marker, she said that even as a child and during her military service (ages 18–20) she expressed feminist views. Joel claims that in the gendered western world, males (as identified by their genitals) are channeled into being "boys", and genitally identified females – into "girls". According to Joel, the common social and cultural perception is one that divides the world of possibilities into two parts. In her opinion, in a world without gender, where there is no social and cultural significance to the shape of a person's genitals, there will be many more possibilities for both females and males.

In 2009, Joel began "Women/Men Conflict Groups" for psychology undergraduates, a program created by Prof. Ariella Friedman, according to a model developed in dialog groups of Jews and Arabs in Neve Shalom. Later, she developed a working model for groups dealing with gender issues, which combines the conflict group model with the awareness group model from the 1970s. Based on this model, she began designing a course in psychology and gender – "Is pink a girl color?", which examined social conventions such as what is "feminine" and "masculine," and people's attitudes, often unconscious, towards various things from the perspective of their gender. The preparation of this course led Joel to her research into the "male brain" and "female brain" in the early 2000s.

Publications

Select refereed articles 
 
 
  Pdf.

Chapters in books

Non-fiction/science

See also 
 Cognitive neuroscience
 Gender essentialism
 Neuroscience of sex differences

References

External links 
 
Selected Publications

Israeli cognitive neuroscientists
Developmental psychologists
Living people
Academic staff of Tel Aviv University
Israeli women neuroscientists
1967 births